The Marin Rowing Association, located in Greenbrae, California, US is a rowing association and non-profit organization founded in 1968 by Coach R.C. "Bob" Cumming.

History
For the first eight years of its existence, the program was composed of high school boys from Redwood High School and what the club called the "Cardiac 8+". The Cardiac 8+ was a small group of men who had previously rowed in college and continued to row on Sunday mornings. That group of men, including Olympian Dick Draeger, held the facility and equipment together.

In 1977, U.C. Berkeley rower Jana Barto began a high school program for women from Redwood High School, and in 1982 Olympian Lou Lindsey joined Coach Cumming to run the men's team, taking over in 1984 after the death of Coach Cumming.

Today both the boys and girls teams, recruiting throughout Marin, row under the name of the Marin Rowing Association.

Numerous Marin juniors have raced on Junior National Teams throughout the years, and some have gone on to represent the United States at the World Rowing Championships and the Olympics. Scott Munn, Fred Honebein, Tim Evans, Tim Ryan and Jerome Ryan, Mike Altman, Brian Ebke and Nito Simonsen are all Marin Rowing Association alumni.

Marin Rowing Association Olympians

The club is currently managed by Sandy Armstrong, who was honored with the USRowing Ernestine Bayer Award at the 2013 USRowing Annual Convention.

Junior Team

The Marin Rowing Association offers a competitive high school rowing program for boys and girls from schools including Redwood High School, Tamalpais High School, Sir Francis Drake High School, Marin Catholic High School, Marin Academy, San Francisco University High School, San Domenico High School, The Branson School, Convent of the Sacred Heart High School, and more.

The Marin juniors are divided into four teams: Varsity Boys, Varsity Girls, Novice Boys and Novice Girls.

Head of the Charles
2010
At the 46th Head of the Charles Regatta in 2010, the Marin boys eight made history by racing from the 69th starting position to win their event, posting a course record (14:50.246) in the process. The girls eight, came in second, just four seconds behind first place.

2011
At the 47th Head of the Charles Regatta in 2011, the Marin boys again placed first. The Marin girls, on the other hand, finished in second place for the second year in a row.

2012
At the 48th Head of the Charles Regatta in 2012, the Marin boys repeated their victory for the third year in a row, this time with a decisive lead of more than 33 seconds to the second finisher. The Marin girls finished in 5th place.

2013
At the 49th Head of the Charles Regatta in 2013, the Marin boys extended their record victory streak to four consecutive wins.

The Marin girls finished in 3rd in the Youth 8+ event, less than a second behind the second place finisher.

2014
At the 50th Head of the Charles Regatta in 2014, the Marin boys placed 2nd by a margin of 1.5 seconds ending their four year streak. The girls walked away with a 5th place finish.

2015
At the 51st Head of the Charles Regatta in 2015, the boys from Marin came in first place over bay area rival Oakland Strokes by a dominating 11 seconds while the Marin girls came home with a second place finish.

2016
At the 52nd Head of the Charles Regatta in 2016, the Marin boys and girls both finished second out of 85 entires.

San Diego Crew Classic

The Marin Rowing Association has won a variety of events at the San Diego Crew Classic over the years. In 2012 and 2014 however, the Marin Rowing Varsity Boys achieved a sweep of all three junior events, becoming the first team to ever do so as well as the first team to ever repeat the achievement.

USRowing Youth National Championships
The Marin Rowing Association has won national championships on numerous occasions. Previously, the Marin Rowing juniors had won several gold medals at the USRowing Youth National Championships at Harsha Lake near Cincinnati, OH; amongst them, the Men's Youth Lightweight 8+ in 2004, the Men's Youth Double Sculls in 2007 and the Women's Youth 8+ in 2008 and 2009.

In more recent years, the Marin Rowing juniors have consistently been top finishers nationally in various boats.

2009 The Marin Rowing Men's Youth 8+ placed 5th,  with the Men's Youth Lightweight 8+ placing 2nd by .28 seconds.

2010 Both the Men's Youth 8+ and Men's Youth Lightweight 8+ came in second.

2011 Was a unique year for Marin Rowing's youth team, which became the first team to sweep the USRowing Youth National Championship with victories in the Men's & Women's Youth 8+ as well as the Men's Youth Lightweight 8+ (composed of 6 novice) at the Oak Ridge, TN venue.

2012 The Marin Men's Youth Lightweight 8+ and Youth 8+ won gold in both events for the second year in a row, while the Women's Youth 8+ finished with a silver medal.

2013 At the 2013 Youth National Championship in Oak Ridge, TN, the men and women's squads from Marin came away with four medals out of the five boats sent. The Women's Youth 8+ won decisively; crossing the finish line with open-water over the second place finisher. The Men's Youth 8+ took third place, while the Men's Youth Lightweight 8+ came home with a second place finish. The Men's Youth 4+ earned a bronze medal and the Men's Youth Lightweight 4+ finished in fourth.

2014 At the 2014 Youth National Championship in Sacramento, CA, was another successful year for the Marin Rowing junior team. The Men's Youth 8+, after overcoming several injuries right before the regatta, finished in 5th place, while the Men's Youth Lightweight 8+ won gold. The Women's Youth 8+ finished in 7th place, while the Women's Youth 2- won by open water.

2015 At the 2015 Youth National Championship in Sarasota, FL the men's and women's teams sent five boats. The Men's Youth 8+ finished 4th, the Women's Youth 8+ finished 10th, the Women's Youth 4+ finished 7th, the Women's Youth Lightweight 4+ finished 5th, while the Men's Youth Lightweight 8+ finished 3rd.

2016 At the 2016 Youth National Championship in West Windsor, NJ the Men's Youth 8+ finished 2nd, the Men's Youth Lightweight 8+ finished 4th, while the Women's Youth 8+ finished 6th.

2017 At the 2017 Youth national Championship in Sarasota, FL the men's and women's team sent four boats. The Men's Youth 8+ finished 9th, the Women's Youth 8+ finished 3rd, the Men's Youth Lightweight 8+ finished 3rd, and the Women's Youth Lightweight 8+ finished 5th.

Marin Rowing Association USRowing Youth National Championship Results

SRAA National Championships

In 2017 the Marin boys sent their Freshmen 8+ to complete at the Scholastic National Championship in Camden, NJ where they won gold.

Marin Rowing Association SRAA National Championship Results

Junior National Team Athletes

Marin Rowing Association Junior National Team Athletes

Indoor Rowing World Records

In 2013, at the annual Marin Rowing Erg-A-Thon, the Marin Junior boys and girls teams set two Concept2 ergometer world records. The boys completed 466,156 meters in 24 hours to set the Male 19 and Under Hwt world record with 77 rowers. The girls rowed 392,521 meters in 24 hours to set the Female 19 and Under Hwt world record with 76 rowers. The Erg-A-Thon took place from February 2 to February 3, 2013 at Bon Air Shopping Center in Greenbrae, CA.

In 2014, the Marin Juniors (both boys and girls) worked together to set another world record at the annual Erg-A-Thon. Both the boys and the girls completed 445,958 meters in 24 hours to set the Mixed 19 and Under Hwt world record. 153 rowers (78 boys and 75 girls) contributed to setting this record. The 2014 Erg-A-Thon was again held at Bon Air Shopping Center in Greenbrae, CA from February 1 to February 2, 2014.

In 2015, a Marin junior Ethan Seder pulled 19:31.0 for the 6k erg piece. Ethan broke the Concept 2 Indoor Rowing World Record for the 15-16 age category.

Masters Team

In 1984, Jana Barto and Joan Corbett started a masters rowing program for adult women. Originally the rowers were parents of the junior men and women, but today that original program has split into beginning, intermediate and advanced levels for men and women, with the competitive/advanced level winning numerous gold medals at State Championship races, the Masters Nationals and the FISA World Regatta.

At the 2013 Head of the Charles Regatta, the Marin Masters came home with six wins. The Men's Senior Master 8+ boat (50 and over) finished first and set a new course record of 15:29.87. For the third year in a row, the Women's Senior Master 8+ boat (50 and over) finished in first place and also set a new course record of 17:35.75. In the Senior Veteran Single (70 and over), Landon Carter earned a gold medal. In the 4+s, the Men's Master 4+ (40 and over) and the Women's Senior Master 4+ (50 and over) both won with the women's four earning another course record. The Men's Veteran 4+ (70 and over) won gold.

2013 was the first year the Marin Rowing Association won the Head of the Charles Team Points Trophy, an honor usually only earned by accomplished collegiate rowing teams.

In 2014 Marin came home with one first place finish in the Men's Senior Master 50+ Eight.

At the 2015 San Diego Crew Classic, Marin took first and third in the Men's Club Eight, a feat never completed before at the crew classic.

At the 2015 Henley Master's regatta, Marin came home with wins in the Men's E4+ and F4+.

References

External links
Marin Rowing Association
Concept2 24 Hour World Records

Rowing clubs in the United States
Sports clubs established in 1968
Sports in Marin County, California